Castelgomberto is a town and comune in the province of Vicenza, Veneto, in northern Italy. It is located east of SP246 provincial road.

Notable people
Michele Carlotto (born 3 February 1919) - bishop
 Francesco Randon (born 23 November 1925) - retired footballer

References

Sources
(Google Maps)

Cities and towns in Veneto